Soondh is a village in Shaheed Bhagat Singh Nagar district of Punjab State, India. The village is administrated by Sarpanch an elected representative of the village.

Demography 
As of 2011, Soondh has a total number of 245 houses and population of 1140 of which 583 include are males while 557 are females according to the report published by Census India in 2011. The literacy rate of Soondh is 77.33% higher than the state average of 75.84%. The population of children under the age of 6 years is 121 which is 10.61% of total population of Soondh, and child sex ratio is approximately 779 as compared to Punjab state average of 846.

Most of the people are from Schedule Caste which constitutes 61.40% of total population in Soondh. The town does not have any Schedule Tribe population so far.

As per the report published by Census India in 2011, 372 people were engaged in work activities out of the total population of Soondh which includes 325 males and 47 females. According to census survey report 2011, 73.92% workers describe their work as main work and 26.08% workers are involved in Marginal activity providing livelihood for less than 6 months.

Education 
The village has 3 school 2 govt and 1 private. Amardeep Singh Shergill Memorial college Mukandpur and Sikh National College Banga are the nearest colleges. Industrial Training Institute is 3 km away.

List of schools nearby:

Govt Senior Secondary School, Soondh
S N Public school, Soondh
Govt High School, Jhander Kalan
Govt Gigh School, Khan Khana
Guru Ram Dass Public School, Cheta

Transport 

See also 
List of villages in India

References

External links 
 Tourism of Punjab
 Census of Punjab
 Locality Based PINCode

Villages in Shaheed Bhagat Singh Nagar district